Alexander F. Vakakis is an American mechanical engineer focusing on controls and dynamics, and currently the Grayce Wicall Gauthier Professor at the University of Illinois.

References

Year of birth missing (living people)
Living people
University of Illinois faculty
American mechanical engineers
California Institute of Technology alumni